Tonla is a town in south-central Ivory Coast. It is a sub-prefecture of Oumé Department in Gôh Region, Gôh-Djiboua District.

Tonla was a commune until March 2012, when it became one of 1126 communes nationwide that were abolished.

In 2014, the population of the sub-prefecture of Tonla was 37,205.

Villages

The 9 villages of the sub-prefecture of Tonla and their population in 2014 are:

 Bléanianda  (5 221)
 Blékoua  (1 939)
 Boessovoda  (2 311)
 Bokéda  (4 245)
 Booda  (5 671)
 Dondi  (2 637)
 Gboménéda  (816)
 Tonla  (7 300)
 Zaddi  (7 065)

References

Sub-prefectures of Gôh
Former communes of Ivory Coast